Maria Liku (born in Levuka on 27 April 1990) is a Fijian weightlifter who represented Fiji at the 2012 Summer Olympics. In the Women's 63 kg event, she ranked at 6.

References 

Olympic weightlifters of Fiji
People from Lomaiviti Province
1990 births
Fijian female weightlifters
Weightlifters at the 2012 Summer Olympics
Living people
I-Taukei Fijian people